The Cobleș is a left tributary of the river Arieșul Mare in Romania. It discharges into the Arieșul Mare in Arieșeni.

References

Rivers of Romania
Rivers of Alba County